Beryl is a given name that has overwhelmingly been borne by females with reference to the mineral beryl. It is deemed unisex due to occasional American usage as a male name, likely a variant spelling of the surname Burrell whose seeming root is the Old French , a reddish-brown woolen fabric with the resultant name denoting a worker in the wool trade; Beryl may also be a variant spelling of the Yiddish (Judeo-German) male name Berel.

Like most jewel names, Beryl's use as a female name dates from the late 19th-century: dancer Beryl de Zoete and actress Beryl Mercer would have been among the earliest namesakes being born respectively in 1879 and 1882. The female name Beryl was always more popular in the British Isles than in North America; since the mid-20th century the name has become somewhat unfashionable in the British Isles.

Females
Females named Beryl include:
 Claire Adams (née Beryl Vere Nassau Adams), actress and benefactor
 Berle Adams (born Beryl Adasky), music industry executive and talent booking agent
 Beryl T. (Sue) Atkins, British lexicographer
 Beryl Bainbridge, novelist
 Beryl Baxter (née M. Ivory), actress
 Beryl Beaurepaire, feminist
 Beryl Bernay, journalist, painter, and photographer
 Beryl Bender Birch, yoga teacher
 Beryl Booker, pianist
Beryl Brewin (1910–1999), New Zealand marine zoologist
 Beryl Paston Brown, academic and teacher
 Beryl Annear Bryant, actress and theatrical producer
 Beryl Bryden, jazz singer
 Beryl Burton, racing cyclist
 Beryl W. Chan, wife of Gerald Chan
 Beryl G.S. Chung, Cannes Lion award winning designer
 Beryl Christie, mother of Donald J. Harris
 Beryl Cook, artist best known for her paintings
 Beryl Cooke, actress
 Beryl Corner, doctor
 Beryl Crockford (formerly Mitchell; née Martin), rower
 Beryl Mildred Cryer, writer
 Beryl Cunningham, actress and model
 Beryl Davis, jazz singer
 Beryl Dean, British religious embroiderer
Beryl de Zoete, ballet dancer
Beryl May Dent, mathematical physicist, technical librarian, and programmer
 Beryl Killeen Donkin, legal secretary
 Beryl-Adolphs Nalowa Esembe, sociologist and anthropologist
 Beryl Evans (née Williams), politician
 Beryl Evans, murder victim by John Christie
 Beryl Evans, actress, wife of Frank Thornton
 Beryl Fletcher, feminist author
 Beryl Fox, documentary film director and producer
 Beryl Gaffney, politician
 Béryl Gastaldello, swimmer
 Beryl Gilroy (née Answick), novelist and teacher
 Beryl Goldwyn Karney, ballet dancer
 Beryl Cynthia Gordon, wife of Harry Bloom
 Beryl Grant, nurse, community worker, and public servant
 Beryl Grey, ballet dancer
 Beryl "Beb" Hearnden, farmer, journalist, and author
 Beryl D. Hines, Cold War-era journalist and aunt of Amy Brenneman
 Beryl A. Howell, judge
 Beryl Hutchinson, British volunteer ambulance driver and officer of the First Aid Nursing Yeomanry
 Beryl Ingham, dancer and actress
 Beryl Elaine Jacka, administrator
 Beryl Jones (née Davies), politician
 Beryl Koltz, film director
 Beryl Korot, video artist
Béryl Laramé, athlete
 Beryl J. Levine, female justice
 Beryl Levinger, academic and teacher
 Beryl Ann Longino, wife of Lloyd Bentsen
 Beryl Markham (née Clutterbuck), horse trainer and aviator
 Beryl Marsden, singer
 Beryl Marshall, swimmer
 Beryl McBurnie, dancer
 Beryl McLeish (née King), civil servant and wartime superintendent
 Beryl Measor, actress
 Beryl Mercer, actress
Beryl Mills, advertising agent, librarian, and beauty queen
Beryl Ann "Bel" Mooney, journalist and broadcaster
Beryl Nashar, geologist, academic, and teacher
 Beryl Noakes, swimmer
 Beryl Oliver, British charity administrator
 Beryl Penrose, tennis player
Beryl H. Potter (born Edna Beryl Hinkle), American astronomical researcher
 Beryl Potter, Canadian disability activist
 Beryl Powell, wife of Adam Clayton Powell III, daughter of Eileen Slocum and John Slocum
Beryl Preston, British sailor
 Beryl Radin, scholar, scientist, editor, and teacher
 Beryl Randle, race walker and an athletics administrator
 Beryl Rawson (née Marie Wilkinson), writer, and teacher
 Beryl Reid, actress
 Beryl Hilda Rigg (née Helliwell), mother of Diana Rigg
 Beryl D. Roberts, politician
Beryl Rowland, historian and teacher
 Beryl Satter, historian and teacher
 Beryl Smalley, historian
 Beryl Smeeton, traveller
 Beryl Splatt, biochemist
 Beryl Swain (née J Tolman), road racer
 Beryl Te Wiata (née McMillan), actor, author, and scriptwriter
 Beryl Tsang, fibre artist
 Beryl Vertue, television producer
 Beryl Wallace (born Beatrice Heischuber), singer, dancer, and actress
 Beryl Wamira, athlete
 Beryl Williams, politician and school teacher

Males
Males named Beryl include:
 Beryl Anthony Jr., politician
 Beryl F. Carroll, politician
 Beryl Clark, football player
 Beryl Drummond, basketball player
 Beryl Follet, football player
 Beryl Newman, Medal of Honor recipient
Beryl Richmond, baseball player
Barney Ross (born Dov-Ber "Beryl" David Rosofsky), boxer
 Beryl Rubinstein, composer
 Beryl Cyril Sheldon Jr., known professionally as Jack Sheldon, musician, singer, comedian, actor
 Beryl Shipley, basketball coach
 Beryl Sprinkel, member of the Executive Office of the U.S. President

Pseudonym 

 Stephen King (as Beryl Evans)

Fictional characters
 Beryl, in Beryl and the Croucher
 Beryl, played by Toni Collette, an emu character in Australian CGI animated film Blinky Bill the Movie
 "Beryl" Beryllinthranox, in Dragonlance
 Beryl, played by Carol White, in A Matter of WHO
 Beryl, played by Alexandra Dane, in Not on Your Nellie
 Queen Beryl, a villainess in the anime Sailor Moon
 Beryl the Peril, British cartoon character, in The Topper and others
 Beryl Abbott, played by Georgann Johnson, in the Alfred Hitchcock Presents episode "One For The Road"
 Beryl Battersby, played by Paula Wilcox, in The Lovers
 Beryl Blenheim, in Chart Throb
 Beryl Chugspoke, played by Georgina Hale, in Emmerdale
 Beryl Crabtree, played by Patricia Garwood, in No Place Like Home
 Beryl Crossthwaite, played by Joan Scott, in Emmerdale
 Aunt Beryl Fairfield, in Prelude
 Beryl Hennessey, played by Polly James in The Liver Birds
 Beryl Humphries, played by Carmel McSharry, in Beryl's Lot
 Beryl Hutchinson, the third and most recent DC Comics superhero known as Squire
 Beryl Stratton Madison, in Body of Evidence
 Beryl Matt, in A Bridge to Wiseman's Cove
 Beryl Merit, played by Rosalind Knight, in Gimme Gimme Gimme
 Beryl Newsome, played by Madelaine Newton, in Inspector Morse episode "Masonic Mysteries"
 Beryl Patmore, played by Lesley Nicol, the cook on the ITV series Downton Abbey
 Beryl Hayden Peacock (also Elliott), played by Anny Tobin, in Coronation Street
 Beryl Stapleton, in The Hound of the Baskervilles
 Red Beryl in Land of the Lustrous
 Beryl Walters, played by Margaret Barton in the film, a character in the play Still Life and film Brief Encounter by Noël Coward
 Beryl, a character created by Joanna Quinn and appearing in her short films: Girls Night Out, Body Beautiful, Dreams And Desires: Family Ties and Affairs of the Art

Other uses 

 1729 Beryl, an asteroid named for Beryl H. Potter

Feminine given names
Given names derived from gemstones